The Tribal College Librarians Institute (TCLI) is a week-long professional development experience for tribal college librarians from all over the United States and Canada, normally held in Bozeman, Montana.

History
The groundwork for TCLI was formed in 1989 when Kathy Kaya, a recently retired Montana State University – Bozeman reference librarian, had a conversation with tribal librarians at Salish Kootenai College about the lack of professional development opportunities for them in Montana. Kathy turned words into action and worked with the Montana State University Libraries and the Montana State University Department of Native American Studies to create TCLI. The first Institute was held in 1990 at Montana State University in Bozeman and was attended by librarians from every tribal college in Montana.

TCLI has grown from a three to a five-day institute and is currently open to all tribal college librarians, tribal college library staff, and any librarians whose mandate it is to serve tribal college students. Funding for TCLI is provided by MSU Libraries and supplemented with grants from private and government institutions. The bulk of the budget is spent on providing travel funds to participants. To date, the Institute has been able to offer limited travel funds to all those requesting assistance. While the majority of participants are from the US, librarians from New Zealand and Canada have also attended. In all there have been approximately 200 different participants from 60 institutions and a total of nearly 500 participants overall.

Subjects of sessions
The Institute has offered sessions on information literacy, grant writing, collection development, Building Library Policies, digitization, preservation, Web 2.0, government information, database training and a host of other subject areas and topics. In addition to the library related topics, the Institute attempts to include sessions on cultural topics as well. In recent years, there have been sessions on the American Indian Movement, Navajo Code Talkers and Ho-Chunk ethnobotany.

Venues
TCLI is primarily held in Bozeman, Montana; however, funding was received from the National Agricultural Library in 2001 and from the National Museum of the American Indian in 2006 to hold the Institute in Washington, D.C. TCLI 2008 was held June 9–13 in Bozeman on the Montana State University campus. The cultural theme for 2008 focused on native languages and coincided with the United Nations declaration of 2008 as the International Year of Languages.

2007 Institute
In 2007, TCLI was attended by 38 participants from 27 institutions, including: 
Blackfeet Community College Library
College of Menominee Nation Library
Diné College Libraries
First Nations University of Canada’s Libraries
Fort Belknap College Library
Fort Peck Tribal Library
Institute of American Indian Arts Library
Little Priest Tribal College
Ojibwa Community Library
LCO Ojibwa College Community Library
Little Big Horn College Library
Salish Kootenai College D'Arcy McNickle Library
Sitting Bull College Library
Southwestern Indian Polytechnic Institute Library
Tohono O'odham Community College Library
Turtle Mountain Community College Library
United Tribes Technical College Library
White Earth Tribal and Community College Library

References

External links
TCLI Homepage
American Indian Library Association
American Indian Higher Education Consortium
Making a Difference in Their Own Way: The Role of Library Directors and Non-Directorial Staff at Tribal College Libraries
"The Tribal College Librarians Institute: Providing Professional Development and Networking in a Close-Knit Environment." PNLA Quarterly, 8-9.
"College Librarians Gain Skills at MSU Institute." Tribal College Journal, 15-2.
"MSU Libraries Tribal College Librarians Institute Goes to D.C." Montana Library Focus, October 2006, Page 3.

Library-related organizations
First Nations organizations
First Nations education
Native American organizations
1990 establishments in Montana